Iris Tree (27 January 1897 – 13 April 1968) was an English poet, actress and art model, described as a bohemian, an eccentric, a wit and an adventurer.

Biography
Tree's parents were actors Sir Herbert Beerbohm Tree and Helen Maud, Lady Tree. Her sisters were actresses Felicity and Viola Tree. An aunt was author Constance Beerbohm, and her uncles were explorer and author Julius Beerbohm and caricaturist and parodist Max Beerbohm.

Iris Tree was sought after as an art model while a young woman, being painted by Augustus John, simultaneously by Duncan Grant, Vanessa Bell and Roger Fry, and sculpted by Jacob Epstein, showing her bobbed hair (she was said to have cut off the rest and left it on a train) that, along with other behavior, caused much scandal. The Epstein sculpture  is displayed at the Tate Britain. She was often photographed by Man Ray, was friends with Nancy Cunard for a time, and acted alongside Diana Cooper in the mid-1920s. 

She studied at the Slade School of Art. She contributed verse to the 1917 Sitwell anthology Wheels; her published collections were Poems (1919), The Traveller and other Poems (1927), and The Marsh Picnic (1966).

She married twice. Her first marriage was to Curtis Moffat, a New York artist; Ivan Moffat, the screenwriter, was their son. She came to America to act in Karl Vollmöller's play The Miracle in 1925, and there met her second husband, the actor and ex-officer of the Austrian cavalry, Count Friedrich von Ledebur. The two roamed around California, gypsy style, with their son, then moved back to Europe where they were involved in the Chekhov Theatre Studio. They both appeared (after their divorce) in the 1956 film version of Moby Dick. She also appeared as a poet, essentially as herself, in Federico Fellini's La Dolce Vita (1960).

See also

 Beerbohm family

References

Further reading
 The Rainbow Picnic: A Portrait of Iris Tree (1974) Daphne Fielding. London: Eyre Methuen

External links 
 
 Tree archive at the University of Bristol Theatre Collection, University of Bristol
 
 

1897 births
1968 deaths
Beerbohm family
English artists' models
English women poets
English people of Lithuanian descent
English people of German descent
20th-century English poets
20th-century English women writers